William Albert L. Morgan (3 November 1891 – after 1927) was an English professional footballer born in Old Hill, Cradley Heath, Staffordshire, who played either at outside left or inside left. He played for Birmingham, Coventry City and Crystal Palace in the Football League, and was capped once for a Football League representative side.

Morgan's appearance for the Football League XI came in February 1919 against the Scottish League at his home ground of St Andrew's, Birmingham, in the first representative match played after the First World War. He set up the second goal for Bob Whittingham in a 3–1 win, and according to the Daily Express reporter, "the pick" of the English XI were Morgan, Whittingham and Joe Clennell.

References

1891 births
Year of death missing
People from Cradley Heath
English footballers
Association football forwards
Cradley Heath F.C. players
Birmingham City F.C. players
Coventry City F.C. players
Crystal Palace F.C. players
Shrewsbury Town F.C. players
English Football League players
Place of death missing
English Football League representative players